The Minister of Trade and Industry was one of the ministerial portfolios in the Finnish Government from 1918 to 2008.

In 2008, the position was replaced by Minister of Economic Affairs.

List of Ministers of Trade and Industry

References

Trade and Industry